San Lorenzo FC was a Honduran football club based on San Lorenzo, Honduras.

History
In summer 2008 they were champions of the Zona Sur of the Honduran third division.

In 2013 they merged with León Libertador of Choluteca.

References 

San Lorenzo